Dmitri Lagutin is a former ice dancer who competed for the Soviet Union. He is the 1989 World Junior champion with partner Angelika Kirkhmaier. Originally from Almaty, he was coached by Yuri Guskov before moving to Natalia Linichuk.

References

Navigation

Soviet male ice dancers
Living people
World Junior Figure Skating Championships medalists
Year of birth missing (living people)